Sohrababad (also Romanized as Sohrābābād; also known as Sohrābād) is a village in Eskelabad Rural District, Nukabad District, Khash County, Sistan and Baluchestan Province, Iran. At the 2006 census, its population was 588, in 98 families.

References 

Populated places in Khash County